Marie Laforêt (born Maïtena Marie Brigitte Doumenach; 5 October 1939 – 2 November 2019) was a French singer and actress, particularly well known for her work during the 1960s and 1970s. In 1978, she moved to Geneva, and acquired Swiss citizenship.

Birth name 
Her first name Maïtena, which is of Basque origin, means "beloved", and is sometimes used by the inhabitants of Languedoc, especially of Pyrénées and also resembles the diminutive of the name Marie-Thérèse, "Maïthé".

Doumenach, her last name, is Catalan in origin – Domènec in Catalan.
Her birth name Maïtena Marie Brigitte Doumenach, and her repertoire which included pieces inspired from world folklore, have led to speculation of an Armenian origin of her parents.
The singer herself used to define herself sometimes as "ariégeoise", i.e. from the region of Ariège in the south of France.

Biography

Childhood and adolescence
Marie Laforêt was born at Soulac-sur-Mer, in Médoc, in the villa "Rithé-Rilou", named after her aunt and her mother: Marie Thérèse and Marie Louise Saint Guily. Her father's family, Doumenach, were originally from Olette, a village in the Pyrénées Orientales, on the border of Têt. Her paternal great-grandfather, Louis Doumenach, led a textile factory at Lavelanet, in Ariège and his son, Charles-Joseph Doumenach, was a colonel and municipal counsellor.

The singer's maternal grandfather built "cabanons" in the resort of Soulac-Sur-Mer, in Gironde in 1886. During the Second World War, the artist's father, an industry man, was captured and detained as a prisoner of war in Germany until the liberation in May 1945. Laforêt, her sister Alexandra and their mother knew a period of many hardships. At the age of three Laforêt suffered a sexual trauma which affected her for a long time. During the war, the Doumenachs found shelter at Cahors and in the province of their ancestors Ariège, in the village Lavelanet. After the war, the family moved to Valenciennes where the father led a factory for railway utensils. Later they settled in Paris. After becoming more religious and having considered becoming a nun, Laforêt continued her secondary studies at the Lycee La Fontaine in Paris. There she began to show interest for the dramatic arts and her first experiences in this domain proved to be therapeutically useful for her through their cathartic effect.

1960s
Her career began accidentally in 1959 when she replaced her sister at the last minute in a French radio talent contest Naissance d'une étoile (birth of a star) and won. Director Louis Malle then cast the young starlet in the film he was shooting at the time, Liberté, a project he finally abandoned, making Laforêt's first appearance on screen her turn opposite actor Alain Delon in René Clément's 1960 drama Plein Soleil.

After this film she became very popular and interpreted many roles in the 1960s. She married director Jean-Gabriel Albicocco, who cast her in some of his own works, including La Fille aux Yeux d'Or (The Girl with the Golden Eyes), based on the Balzac story, which would become her nickname.

In her second film, Saint Tropez Blues, accompanied by a young Jacques Higelin at the guitar, she sang the title song and immediately started releasing singles, her first hit being 1963's Les Vendanges de l'Amour. Her songs offered a more mature, poetic, tender alternative to the light, teenage yé-yé tunes charting in France at the time. Her melodies borrowed more from exotic folk music, especially South American and Eastern European, than from contemporary American and British pop acts. Laforêt worked with many important French composers, musicians and lyricists, such as André Popp and Pierre Cour, who provided her with a panoply of colorful, sophisticated orchestral arrangements, featuring dozens of musical instruments and creating a variety of sounds, sometimes almost Medieval, Renaissance or Baroque, other times quite modern and innovative.

With businessman Judas Azuelos, a Moroccan Jew of Sephardic descent, she had two children, a daughter and a son. The daughter, Lisa Azuelos, is a French director, writer, and producer, who made a film about another famous French singer, Dalida, in 2017.

1970s
At the end of the 1960s, Laforêt had become a rather distinctive figure in the French pop scene. Her music stood out, perhaps too much for her new label CBS Records, which expected of her more upbeat, simpler songs. She was interested in making more personal records, but finally gave in. Although her most financially successful singles ("Viens, Viens", a cover of the German hit ″Rain Rain Rain″, and "Il a neigé sur Yesterday", a ballad about the break-up of the Beatles) were released in the 1970s, Laforêt progressively lost interest in her singing career, moving to Geneva, Switzerland in 1978, where she opened an art gallery and abandoned music.

1980 to 2019
In the 1980s, Laforêt concentrated on her acting career, appearing in a few French and Italian films. Some music singles were eventually released, but were not popular. She made a comeback, however, in 1993 with her final album, for which she wrote the lyrics. In the 1990s, she again continued to work as an actress, both on screen and on stage. She performed in a number of plays in Paris over the years, acclaimed by audiences and critics alike. In September 2005, she sang once again, going on tour in France for the first time since 1972. Every concert was sold out. Laforêt resided in Geneva and obtained Swiss citizenship.

Death

Marie Laforêt died on 2 November 2019 in Genolier, Switzerland, a small town in the Nyon district near Geneva, from the consequences of a primary bone cancer as revealed by one of her daughters, Deborah Kahn-Sriber in 2020. She was 80 years old. Her funeral took place in Paris, at the church on Saint-Eustache, on 24 November; followed by the burial in the family crypt at the Père-Lachaise Cemetery.

Recordings

Folk music

Laforêt was fond of folk music ever since she began recording in the early 1960s. She helped popularize the Bob Dylan song "Blowin' in the Wind" in France with her 1963 interpretation. On the B-side of the same EP she sings the classic American folk ballad "House of the Rising Sun". Her other folk recordings include: "Viens sur la montagne", a 1964 French adaptation of the African-American spiritual "Go Tell It on the Mountain", recorded by American folk trio Peter, Paul and Mary the previous year, "Coule doux" (Hush-a-Bye), another Peter, Paul and Mary song, 1966's "Sur les chemins des Andes", a French version of the traditional Peruvian song "El Cóndor Pasa", and "La voix du silence", a 1966 cover of American duo Simon and Garfunkel's first hit, "The Sound of Silence".

Rock music

She also recorded some rock songs in the 1960s, her most famous being "Marie-douceur, Marie-colère", a 1966 cover of the Rolling Stones hit "Paint It Black". Another popular recording was 1965's girl group-style "A demain, my darling", known by English-speakers as "The Sha La La Song" written by Marianne Faithfull on her debut eponymous album.

Pop music

Some of her most memorable pop songs are those written or arranged by French composer André Popp, such as "Entre toi et moi", "L'amour en fleurs", "Les noces de campagne", "Mon amour, mon ami", and "Manchester et Liverpool". The melody of the latter song gained fame in the former Soviet Union as the background music to the Vremya television news programme's weather forecast in the 1970s.

Other music

The quiet, bittersweet and minimally arranged ballad "Je voudrais tant que tu comprennes" (1966), composed by Francis Lai, is a Marie Laforêt favorite. Homage was paid to the song in the 1980s when French pop superstar Mylène Farmer added it to her own concert repertoire.

The 1973 hit "Viens, viens" was a cover version of a German song "Rain, Rain, Rain" performed by Simon Butterfly.

Laforêt's 1977 hit "Il a neigé sur Yesterday", perhaps her most well-known recording, was penned by musician Jean-Claude Petit, and lyricist Michel Jourdan, (famous for his work with Dalida, Nana Mouskouri, Michel Fugain and Mike Brant) and who had written the words for earlier Laforêt songs, such as "Les vendanges de l'amour" and "L'orage".

Filmography 

Movies

Television Movies

 1961 : Le Rouge et le Noir de Pierre Cardinal (téléfilm): Mathile De La Mole
 1965 : La redevance du fantôme de Robert Enrico (téléfilm): Miss Diamond
 1972 : Kean: Un roi de théâtre de Marcel Moussy (téléfilm): Comtesse Elena de Kloefeld
 1984 : Emmenez-moi au théâtre (série TV): Pauline
 1987 : La Mafia 3 (La Piovra 3) de Luigi Perelli (série TV): Anna Antinari
 1988 : Le loufiat (série TV): la star
 1989 : La Bugiarda, de Franco Giraldi (téléfilm): Elvira
 1989 : Isabella la ladra (série TV): Elvira
 1990 : L'affaire Rodani (Quattro piccole donne) de Gianfranco Albano (série TV): la mère des quatre filles
 1992 : Un cane sciolto 3 de Giorgio Capitani (téléfilm): Hélène
 1994 : A che punto è la notte ? de Nanni Loy (téléfilm): Chantal Guidi
 1995 : Adrien Le Sage: Ma fille est impossible (téléfilm): Comtesse de Pontigny
 1996 : L'histoire du Samedi (série TV): Françoise
 1997 : Le Désert de feu (Desierte di fuoco) d'Enzo G. Castellari (téléfilm): Rahma
 1998 : Jeudi 12 de Patrick Vidal (série TV): Françoise Gamelin
 1998 : Villa Vanille de Jean Sagols (téléfilm): Pronia

Discography 
Studio Albums

 1964 : Viens sur la montagne
 1965 : La Fleur sans nom
 1967 : Manchester et Liverpool
 1968 : Le Lit de Lola
 1968 : Que calor la vida
 1969 : Le Vin de l’été
 1970 : Portrait
 1972 : Ay tu me plais
 1973 : Pourquoi les Hommes pleurent ?
 1974 : Noé
 1976 : La Vérité
 1977 : Il reviendra
 1979 : Moi je voyage
 1993 : Reconnaissances (Une Musique)

Live Albums

 1970 : Récital
 1998 : Voyage au long cours

Spanish Albums

 1964 : Y Volvamos al Amor
 1965 : Entre Tú y Yo
 1968 : Qué Calor la Vida
 1969 : Mon amour, mon ami

Italian Albums

 1964 : La Cantante Dagli Occhi d’Oro

Portuguese Albums

 1967 : Sôbre a Montanha

1960s singles and EPs

 1960 : Saint-Tropez Blues / Tumbleweed
 1963 : Tu fais semblant – Les vendanges de l'amour / Mary Ann – Les jeunes filles
 1963 : Blowin' in the Wind – Flora / House of the Rising Sun – Banks on the Ohio
 1963 : Au coeur de l'automne – L'amour en fleurs / Qu'est-ce qui fait pleurer les filles – Mais si loin de moi
 1963 : La vendemmia dell'amore – E giusto / Una noia senza fine – Che male c'e
 1964 : Viens sur la montagne – Les noces de campagne / Un amour qui s'éteint – L'amour qu'il fera demain
 1964 : La tendresse – La plage / Après toi qui sait – L'arbre qui pleure
 1965 : Katy cruelle – Entre toi et moi / La bague au doigt – Ma chanson faite pour toi
 1965 : Ah ! Dites, dites – Julie Crèvecoeur / Viens – À demain my darling
 1965 : La plage / Après toi, qui sait
 1966 : La voix du silence (The Sound of Silence) – Siffle, siffle ma fille / Je t'attends – L'orage
 1966 : Marie-douceur, Marie-colère (Paint It Black) – Toi qui dors / Je voudrais tant que tu comprennes – La moisson
 1966 : Manchester et Liverpool – Pourquoi ces nuages / Prenons le temps – Sur les chemins des Andes
 1966 : Mon amour, mon ami – Sébastien / Je suis folle de vous – Mon village au fond de l'eau
 1967 : Ivan, Boris et moi – Je ne peux rien promettre / Pour celui qui viendra – Tom
 1968 : Le lit de Lola – Qu'y-a-t-il de changé / Et si je t'aime – A la gare de Manhattan
 1968 : El polo – L'air que tu jouais pour moi / Le tengo rabia al silencio – House of the rising sun
 1968 : Que calor la vida – Mais mon coeur est vide / La valse des petits chiens blancs – Requiem pour trois mariages
 1969 : Au printemps – Roselyne / Feuilles d'or – D'être à vous
 1969 : Pour une étoile – Ton coeur sauvage / Vin de l'été – En plus de l'amour
 1969 : Ah ! Si mon moine – On n'oublie jamais / Tourne, tourne – La fleur sans nom
 1969 : Tu es laide / Toi, nos enfants et moi

1960s LPs

 1964 : Marie Laforêt
 1965 : Marie Laforêt Vol. 2
 1967 : Marie Laforêt Vol. 3
 1968 : Marie Laforêt Vol. 4
 1968 : Que calor la vida
 1969 : Marie Laforêt Vol. 6
 1970 : Marie Laforêt Vol. 7

Publications 

 1981 : Contes et légendes de ma vie privée
 2001 : Mes petites magies, livre de recettes pour devenir jeune
 2002 : Panier de crabes : les vrais maîtres du monde
 2008 : Sous le pseudonyme d'Erna Huili-Collins. Ouvrage collectif Correspondances intempestives : à la folie... pas du tout, Triartis
 2020 : Nous n'avons pas d'autre choix que de croire

See also
 Lisa Azuelos

References

Additional sources 

 Pierre Fageolle & Egon Kragel, Marie Laforêt , éd. ... Car rien n'a d'importance, 1994
 Pierre Saka, Yann Plougastel (dir.), La Chanson française et francophone, Guide Totem, Larousse/HER, 1999 (2-03-511346-6)
 Alain Wodrascka, Marie Laforêt - La femme aux cent visages, éd. L'Étoile du Sud, 1999
 Alain Wodrascka, Marie Laforêt - Portrait d'une star libre, éd. Didier Carpentier, 2009
 Alain Wodrascka, Marie Laforêt - long courrier vers l'aurore, Mustang éditions, préface de Nilda Fernandez, 2014

External links 
 
interview about her family life, in French
some biographical data in Généalogie Magazine Nr 294. 2010 
a biography, archives de la musique de la semaine
interview about the place of religion in her life
about her career, 2005
Illustrated Discography

1939 births
2019 deaths
Burials at Père Lachaise Cemetery
People from Gironde
French women singers
French film actresses
French television actresses
French emigrants to Switzerland
Swiss film actresses
Swiss television actresses
Naturalised citizens of Switzerland